Jewelry Box is the fifteenth studio album by Japanese singer Shizuka Kudo. It was released on July 3, 2002, through Extasy Japan. It is her first studio album in three years, since Full of Love. It is also Kudo's first and only studio album released under the label Extasy Japan.

Commercial performance
Jewelry Box debuted at number 60 on the Oricon Albums Chart. It charted for a single week in the top 300 and sold a total of 4,000 copies, as reported by Oricon.

Track listing

Charts

References

2002 albums
Shizuka Kudo albums
Pony Canyon albums